Sir Douglas Arthur Montrose Graham  (born 12 January 1942) is a former New Zealand politician. He was an MP from 1984 to 1999, representing the National Party.

Early life and family
Graham was born in Auckland, and attended Southwell School and Auckland Grammar School. In 1965 he obtained an LLB from the University of Auckland and became a lawyer, establishing his own practice in 1968. From 1973 to 1983, he lectured in legal ethics at the University of Auckland. He was chairman of the board of the Auckland Regional Orchestra from 1982 to 1983.

His great-grandfather Robert Graham was a member of the 2nd, 3rd and 4th New Zealand parliaments, from 1855 to 1868. In 2008, his brother Kennedy Graham was elected to parliament representing the Green Party. His son, Carrick, is a public relations consultant.

Member of Parliament

In the lead up to the 1981 election Graham unsuccessfully challenged Allan Highet for the National nomination for the suburban Auckland electorate of Remuera. Three years later Highet retired and Graham was elected to Parliament in the 1984 election as his replacement. After entering parliament National leader Sir Robert Muldoon designated Graham spokesperson for the Arts, Insurance and EQC. When Muldoon was replaced by his deputy Jim McLay Graham was appointed Shadow Minister for Disarmament and was later allocated the Revenue portfolio as well. He initially retained those roles after McLay was ousted by Jim Bolger, but substituted the Revenue portfolio for Broadcasting in September 1987 but in a major reshuffle in February 1990 he changed back from Broadcasting to Revenue and was also appointed Shadow Minister for Constitutional Issues.

Cabinet minister

When the National Party won the 1990 election, Graham was appointed to Cabinet, becoming Minister of Justice, Minister of Disarmament and Arms Control, and Minister of Cultural Affairs. In 1993, he became Minister for Treaty of Waitangi Negotiations, perhaps his most prominent role. He was widely praised by both Pākehā and Māori for his work on numerous Treaty settlements, although opponents of the process have voiced criticisms of his policies. Later, Graham also became Attorney-General and Minister for Courts. In the 1996 election, when the Remuera seat was abolished, Graham became a list MP. He was ranked sixth on National's party list, a relatively high placing.

On 21 May 1998 Graham was appointed to the Privy Council and became the Right Honourable Douglas Graham.

Life after politics
He retired from politics at the 1999 election. In the 1999 New Year Honours, Graham was appointed a Knight Companion of the New Zealand Order of Merit, for services as a Minister of the Crown and Member of Parliament.

On 24 February 2012 he was convicted, along with fellow former Justice Minister Bill Jeffries and two other men, of breaching the Securities Act by making untrue statements to investors in his capacity as a director of Lombard Finance. Justice Robert Dobson wrote, "I am satisfied that the accused genuinely believed in the accuracy and adequacy of the ... documents", but that the offences were ones of strict liability so there was no need for "any form of mental intent to distribute documents that were false or misleading". Graham was sentenced to 300 hours' community service and ordered to pay $100,000 in reparation. The Court of Appeal dismissed his appeal against conviction and increased his sentence to six months' home detention and 200 hours' community work, but the Supreme Court restored the original sentence. Retired Court of Appeal judge Sir Edmund Thomas described the convictions as a "grievous miscarriage of justice", saying of the crucial piece of evidence that "you would never ever convict a dog on the basis of the schedule". There have been calls for his knighthood to be revoked, but Prime Minister John Key announced on 1 November 2013 that Graham would keep his knighthood.

Notes

References

|-

|-

|-

|-

1942 births
Attorneys-General of New Zealand
Living people
Members of the Cabinet of New Zealand
20th-century New Zealand lawyers
New Zealand National Party MPs
University of Auckland alumni
Academic staff of the University of Auckland
People educated at Auckland Grammar School
New Zealand list MPs
Members of the New Zealand House of Representatives
Knights Companion of the New Zealand Order of Merit
New Zealand MPs for Auckland electorates
New Zealand members of the Privy Council of the United Kingdom
New Zealand politicians convicted of crimes
New Zealand politicians awarded knighthoods
Justice ministers of New Zealand